These are the official results of the Women's 3,000 metres event at the 1986 European Championships in Stuttgart, West Germany, held at Neckarstadion on 26 and 28 August 1986.

Medalists

Final

Qualifying heats

Participation
According to an unofficial count, 28 athletes from 15 countries participated in the event.

 (2)
 (1)
 (1)
 (2)
 (1)
 (1)
 (2)
 (1)
 (3)
 (3)
 (2)
 (2)
 (3)
 (3)
 (1)

See also
 1982 Women's European Championships 3,000 metres (Athens)
 1983 Women's World Championships 3,000 metres (Helsinki)
 1984 Women's Olympic 3,000 metres (Los Angeles)
 1987 Women's World Championships 3,000 metres (Rome)
 1988 Women's Olympic 3,000 metres (Seoul)
 1990 Women's European Championships 3,000 metres (Split)

References

 Results

3000
3000 metres at the European Athletics Championships
1986 in women's athletics